Omloop der Kempen is an elite men's and women's professional road bicycle racing event held annually in Veldhoven, Netherlands. Since 1995, the men's event is UCI 1.2 rated and is part of the UCI Europe Tour. Since 1997 there is also a women's event. The women's race also had the names GP Van der Heijden and GP Sankomij Veldhoven.

Honours

Men 

Source

Women 

Source

References

External links 
 

Cycle races in the Netherlands
Women's road bicycle races
Recurring sporting events established in 1948
1948 establishments in the Netherlands
Men's road bicycle races
Cycling in North Brabant
Sport in Veldhoven